González Velázquez may refer to:
Pablo González Velázquez (1664-1727), Spanish late-Baroque sculptor
Luis González Velázquez (1715-1763), Spanish late-Baroque painter, son of the previous
Alejandro González Velázquez (1719-1772), Spanish late-Baroque architect and painter, brother of the previous
Antonio González Velázquez (1723-1793), Spanish late-Baroque painter, brother of Alejandro and Luis
Zacarías González Velázquez (1763-1834), Spanish late-Baroque painter, son of the previous
Isidro González Velázquez (1765-1829), Spanish late-Baroque architect, brother of the previous
José Emilio González Velázquez, Puerto Rican politician and Senator, son of the previous